is a rhythmic music game developed and published by FuRyu. It is the second Jewelpet game for the Nintendo 3DS after Jewelpet Magical Rhythm Yay! and overall the fifth game in the Handheld series. It was released on November 8, 2012, and contains some elements from the fourth anime series, Jewelpet Kira☆Deco!.

Gameplay

The gameplay of Jewelpet: Magical Dance in Style☆Deco! adapts both the musical elements of the first two Nintendo DS games as well as the life simulation elements of the third game like the previous series, but has updated mechanics. Like the previous games, the game is a cross between a music and life simulation, with the gameplay is done by using 3DS's stylus, similar to Osu! Tatakae! Ouendan. The player must first name itself and chose one of the 10 Jewelpets in the start. Then the game takes the player to the in-world screen on where the player must go to a specific location using the stylus to access a music session, or talk to NPCs. The game's music session requires the use of the stylus, and the instrument the player chose before the session. The player must touch the jewel flowers appearing on the screen to successfully synchronize with the music and do special combos. In each successful clear, the player collect jewels to unlock new items and instruments as well as new Jewelpets. Each clear depends on the ranking the player gets on how experienced it is on playing the game.

New features
The storyline of the game is loosely based on the anime, with a few references from the fourth series, Jewelpet Kira☆Deco!. The new dress-up feature is now included for customizing the player's Jewelpet as well as a fashion contest to showcase the Jewelpet in its clothing and compete with others for the player to win. Also, minigames from the third game are implemented such as catching dandelion seeds or gardening. The Augmented Reality feature returns from the fourth game, allowing players to view their Jewelpets using the 3DS's camera and the AR cards. Unlike the first 3DS game, players can now view two Jewelpets at a time using two AR cards.

Playable Jewelpets

Development
An official teaser site was opened by FuRyu to announce the second game for the 3DS during August 2012. Later on after the announcement, Famitsu gave an in-depth update to the game, stating the game will have updated game mechanics from previous games, like the return of the minigames from the third game Jewelpet Let's play Together in the Room of Magic! and the inclusion of the dress-up feature for customizing the player's Jewelpet. In the new site update, the developers revealed 10 playable Jewelpets in the game.

References

External links
 Official Website

Japan-exclusive video games
2012 video games
FuRyu games
Nintendo 3DS games
Nintendo 3DS-only games
Video games based on toys
Video games developed in Japan
Video games featuring female protagonists
Music video games
Jewelpet
Sanrio video games

ja:ジュエルペット